Paula Linda Liniņa (born 6 May 2001) is a Latvian footballer who plays as a midfielder for Sieviešu Futbola Līga club FS Metta and the Latvia women's national team.

References

2001 births
Living people
Latvian women's footballers
Women's association football midfielders
Latvia women's youth international footballers
Latvia women's international footballers